Taiwu Township is a mountain indigenous township in Pingtung County, Taiwan. It has a population of 5,319 and an area of  The main population is the indigenous Paiwan people.

Administrative divisions
The township comprises six villages: Jiaping, Jiaxing, Pinghe, Taiwu, Wanan and Wutan.

References

External links

 Taiwu Government website 

Townships in Pingtung County